The Honduras Open was a golf tournament on the PGA Tour Latinoamérica between 2015 and 2017. The tournament was first played in 2015 with the inaugural winner being Venezuelan Felipe Velázquez.

Winners

References 

PGA Tour Latinoamérica events
Recurring sporting events established in 2015
Recurring sporting events disestablished in 2017
Defunct sports competitions in Honduras
2015 establishments in Honduras
2017 disestablishments in Honduras